This Might Sting a Little was the second album by Christian metal group Disciple, released in 1999. The album contained a bonus disc for the buyer to "give the CD to someone that is not saved!". This album was remastered and re-released in 2004. This is the only Disciple album to contain no Ballads of any form.

Track listing
"I Just Know"  – 4:22
"Golden Calf"  – 3:16
"Big Bad Wolf"  – 3:53
"1, 2, Conductor"  – 3:32
"Mud Puddle"  – 3:51
"Worship Conspiracy"  – 2:44
"10 Minute Oil Change"  – 2:54
"Turmoil"  – 5:09
"Hello"  – 2:27
"Bring the Heat"  – 3:08
"Bernie's Situation"  – 4:47
"Underneath"  – 3:56
"Furthermore" (Contains a sermon given by Kevin)  – 7:07

Bonus disc track listing
"I Just Know"  – 4:24
"Golden Calf"  – 3:18
"Furthermore" (Contains a sermon given by Kevin)  – 7:08

Total length: 14:50

References

Disciple (band) albums
1999 albums
Albums produced by Travis Wyrick